This is a list of concert arias, songs and canons by Wolfgang Amadeus Mozart.

Arias, canzonettas, cavatinas

Soprano

Contralto

Tenor

Bass

Group

Songs

Canons

See also
List of compositions by Wolfgang Amadeus Mozart
Köchel catalogue

References

Arias